Mahesh Sharma is an Indian former cricketer who played for Rajasthan.

Sharma played nine first-class matches between 1973 and 1976, scoring 166 runs with a highest score of 45 at an average of 12.76.

References

External links
 

Cricketers from Rajasthan
Indian cricketers
Living people
Rajasthan cricketers
Year of birth missing (living people)